In some versions of the Unix operating system, the term universe was used to denote some variant of the working environment. During the late 1980s, most commercial Unix variants were derived from either System V or BSD. Most versions provided both BSD and System V universes and allowed the user to switch between them. Each universe, typically implemented by separate directory trees or separate filesystems, usually included different versions of commands, libraries, man pages, and header files. While such a facility offered the ability to develop applications portable across both System V and BSD variants, the requirements in disk space and maintenance (separate configuration files, twice the work in patching systems) gave them a problematic reputation. Systems that offered this facility included Harris/Concurrent's CX/UX, Convex's Convex/OS, Apollo's Domain/OS (version 10 only), Pyramid's DC/OSx (dropped in SVR4-based version 2), Concurrent's Masscomp/RTU, MIPS Computer Systems' RISC/os, Sequent's DYNIX/ptx and Siemens' SINIX. 

External links
 Sven Mascheck, DYNIX 3.2.0 and SINIX V5.20 Universes

Unix